Thiotricha corylella is a moth of the family Gelechiidae. It was described by Mikhail Mikhailovich Omelko in 1993. It is found in Japan, the Russian Far East (Primorsky Krai) and China (Jilin).

References

Moths described in 1993
Thiotricha